Konotopski is a typical Polish gentry family, like many other Szlachta of the Kingdom of Poland and the Duchy of Ruthenia, later prominent in Ukrainian history, science, and arts. They used the Belina coat of arms.

See also 

Konotop

Konotopski family
Polish noble families
Ukrainian noble families